CI Tauri is a young star, about 2 million years old, located approximately 500 light years away in the constellation Taurus. It is still accreting material from a debris disk at an unsteady pace, possibly modulated by the eccentric orbital motion of the inner planet. The spectral signatures of compounds of sulfur were detected from the disk.

The magnetic field on the surface of CI Tauri, equal to 0.22 T, is close to average for T Tauri stars.

Planetary system
In 2016 a planet, CI Tauri b, was discovered orbiting CI Tauri on a very tight yet eccentric 9-day orbit.

The discovery of CI Tauri b was notable because it is a hot Jupiter, which are supposed to take a minimum of 10 million years to form, and are often thought to be too close to their parent stars to have formed there. 

The spectral signature of carbon monoxide attributed to the atmosphere of CI Tauri b was detected in 2019.

Additional planets suspected 
In 2018 the possible detection of three more planets (inferred by gaps in the protoplanetary disk surrounding the star) was announced. Using the Atacama Large Millimeter Array (ALMA) to look for 'siblings' of CI Tauri b, a team of researchers detected three distinct gaps in the protoplanetary disk which their theoretical modelling suggests are caused by three other planets. The two outer planets are believed to be about the mass of Saturn, while the inner planet's mass is around the same as CI Tauri b. Two of the new planets are similarly located to those inferred in the HL Tauri protoplanetary disk.

If this discovery is confirmed this would be the most massive collection of exoplanets ever detected at this age with its four planets spanning a factor of a thousand in orbital radius.

The gaps are visible in wideband photography, but not in the gas spectral lines. These "gaps" may be lower-temperature shadows of dust in the inner disk cast on outer parts rather than true gaps carved by planets.

References

Taurus (constellation)
T Tauri stars
J04335200+2250301
Planetary systems with one confirmed planet
Tauri, CI
K-type subgiants